is a Japanese tokusatsu superhero television series. It is the sixteenth installment in the popular Kamen Rider Series of tokusatsu programs. It is a joint collaboration between Ishimori Productions and Toei. The series was broadcast on TV Asahi.  The first episode aired on January 29, 2006, and with the final episode airing on January 21, 2007, completing the series with 49 episodes. Super Hero Time with alongside GoGo Sentai Boukenger.

The series represents the 35th anniversary of the Kamen Rider Series, as indicated by a notice at the beginning of the pilot episode reading, in Japanese, "Kamen Rider 35th Anniversary Production." Kamen Rider Kabuto is the first Kamen Rider Series to be broadcast in a high-definition format.

Story

Seven years before the series, a meteorite struck the Shibuya district in Tokyo. An alien lifeform, known as the Worms, emerged from the meteorite and became a threat to humanity. Souji Tendo has been trained for seven years while waiting for the Kabuto Zecter so that he may properly take up the mantle of Kamen Rider Kabuto. Making many enemies while at the same time meeting other Riders with mysterious origins, Tendou attempts to accomplish his goal at all costs: to destroy all Worms that threaten humanity. He meets ZECT operative Arata Kagami, who later becomes Kamen Rider Gatack. The two soon work together to save humanity from the alien Worms—but not before uncovering the conspiracies within the ZECT organization and the "Natives" species.

Masked Rider System
They were created by the Natives, a species of Worm that arrived on Earth 35 years ago. These Natives in turn gave the Zecters to humans so that they may protect them from alien Worms that would arrive later. The Zecters appear instantaneously from the ZECT headquarters to the selected personnel so that they may transform into the respective Rider to fight any Worms in the vicinity. They also have the ZECTroopers to help them. Worth noting is that the Zecters have a mind of their own and can reject their present user in search of another one if they so choose.

There are eight known Zecters within the Masked Rider System, each allowing the user to become a different Rider. Most Zecters are based on insects, with the exception of the Sasword Zecter, which is based on a scorpion.

Kamen Rider Kabuto
Kamen Rider TheBee
Kamen Rider Drake
Kamen Rider Sasword
Kamen Rider Gatack
Kamen Rider KickHopper
Kamen Rider PunchHopper
Kamen Rider Dark Kabuto

There also exist two other Zecters known as the Perfect Zecter and the Hyper Zecter. The Perfect Zecter serves as a primary weapon while the Hyper Zecter is a power-up device that enhances the powers of the original Zecter. Both were only used by Kabuto in the series, but Gatack got to use the Hyper Zecter in the Hyper Battle DVD.

Allusions
The series made some allusions to the whole Kamen Rider series. Masked Rider Project as mentioned in the course of the series was said to have started on 3 April 1971. The Worm species known as Natives also first arrived on Earth on the same year. In real-life, it was the date the first Kamen Rider show aired for the first time.

Episodes

God Speed Love

The movie of the 2006 Kamen Rider Series, entitled , was released in Japan on August 5. The film took place in a previous timeline and served as an prequel to the series, featuring three new Riders known as Hercus, Ketaros and Caucasus.

Hyper Battle Video
In , Arata Kagami seeks to get the Hyper Zecter just like Souji Tendou, so he tries to emulate Tendou. Once he realizes that he has to be himself, the Hyper Zecter appears and allows him to transform into Kamen Rider Gatack Hyper Form, which only appears in the DVD. The Kabuto and Gatack Zecters speak to Tendou and Kagami throughout the DVD, voiced by Tomokazu Seki and Kōji Yusa, respectively.

Production
The Kamen Rider Kabuto trademark was registered by Toei on October 26, 2005.

Video game
A video game based on the series was produced by Bandai for the PlayStation 2, under the name Kamen Rider Kabuto. Released on November 30, 2006, it is a fighting game featuring all Riders seen in the show and movie, along with Hyper Gatack. The game features 5 different modes of play, ranging from a story mode to several multiplayer modes.

Novel
, written by Shōji Yonemura, is part of a series of spin-off novel adaptions of the Heisei Era Kamen Riders. The mysteries behind Kamen Rider Kabuto are revealed as Tendou Souji fights his final battle with the Worms. After the battle, he travels around the world starting from Bangkok, Thailand to Varanasi, India. During this time, the story followed Arata Kagami as he tries to court with Hiyori Kusakabe. The novel was released on November 30, 2012.

Cast
: 
: 
: 
: 
: 
: 
: 
: 
: 
: 
: 
: 
: 
: 
: 
: 
: 
: 
: 
: 
: 
: 
: 
: 
Zecter Voice: 
Narration:

Guest actors

: 
: 
: 
: 
: 
: 
: 
: 
: 
: 
:

Songs 
Opening theme
"NEXT LEVEL"
Lyrics: Shoko Fujibayashi
Composition & Arrangement: Cher Watanabe
Artist: YU-KI (of TRF)
Episodes: 1 - 48
Insert themes
"FULL FORCE"
Lyrics: Shoko Fujibayashi
Composition: nishi-ken
Arrangement: RIDER CHIPS & Cher Watanabe
Artist: RIDER CHIPS
Episodes: 2 - 32
"LORD OF THE SPEED"
Lyrics: Shoko Fujibayashi
Composition: Cher Watanabe
Arrangement: RIDER CHIPS & Cher Watanabe
Artist: RIDER CHIPS featuring Arata Kagami (Yuuki Sato)
Episodes: 33 - 48

35th Masked Rider Anniversary File
During episodes 23 through 27, this segment called the 35th Masked Rider Anniversary File, acted as a look back to the franchise and an early advertisement for the God Speed Love movie. These look backs are held in a movie theater and the segment is hosted by Soji Tendo (Kamen Rider Kabuto), Arata Kagami (Kamen Rider Gatack), Tetsuki Yamato (Kamen Rider Ketaros), Yuzuki Misaki, and Masato Mishima. During these five segments, they discuss the history of the Kamen Rider franchise, sometimes in a comedic tone, but always with serious background music. 
Episode 23 (Rider Kicks): The group watches and Yamato narrates the variations of Rider Kicks during the course of the years. Yamato mentions the Rider Double Kick of Kamen Riders 1 and 2, Kamen Rider V3's V3 Kick, Kamen Rider X's X Kick, and Kamen Rider Super-1's ten kicks. In the end, Kagami stands up and does his own Rider Kick (he even shouts the attack name) and falling into his seat with Yuzuki looking. Tendo asks Yamato, "Who are you?"
Episode 24 (Criminal Organizations): The group watches and learns about the different criminal organizations the Kamen Riders had to fight. Villains include Shocker & Gel-Shocker in the first Kamen Rider, Destron from Kamen Rider V3, and King Dark (of the Government of Darkness) in Kamen Rider X. Footage of Black Satan, the first enemy of Kamen Rider Stronger, is also shown. Tendo then supposes that it is the Kamen Rider's destiny to fight an organization. Mishima tells Tendo that ZECT will show no mercy to anyone who fights them. Yamato then says that he will definitely smash Neo-ZECT for rebelling against and splitting off from ZECT.
Episode 25 (Rhinoceros Beetle-Themed Kamen Riders): The group watches Kamen Rider Stronger, and Kagami quickly thinks that Stronger himself is Kabuto, then looks at Tendo confused. Misaki corrects him, informing him that this is a different Rider, using the rhinoceros beetle as a design. Mishima then announces that it is Kamen Rider Stronger. The camera then zooms on Tendo's face as he says that while this Rider may be Stronger, he (referring to himself) is the strongest. Tendo pronounces "Stronger" and "Strongest" in English, (due to the fact that Hiro Mizushima, who portrays Tendou, is fluent in English). Yamato then also speaks of the Kabutech Riders (Caucasus [Caucasus beetle], Heracus [Hercules beetle], and Ketaros [centaurus beetle], the last of whom Yamato happens to be), which are also Rhinoceros Beetle Riders (as the Caucasus, Hercules, and Centaurus beetles are rhinoceros beetle sub-species). Also, despite being a Rhinoceros Beetle Rider, Kamen Rider Blade (also a Hercules beetle) was omitted. At the end, Tendo stands up and miniature hexagons with Tendo's face appear, forming a compound eye pattern as Tendo says once again that he is "the man who walks the path of heaven that will rule over everything."
Episode 26 (Riders Everywhere): The group watches Kamen Rider and Yamato comments on Skyrider's Sailing Jump, then says that the Riders can go anywhere around the world. In addition, they are not restricted to the ground. Then, Misaki mentions the Riders can even now go into space. During this segment, they watch footage of Kamen Riders 1 through ZX training with each other in Kamen Rider 1's base on Arizona in the final episodes of Kamen Rider Black RX, followed by footage from God Speed Love. Tendo then coins a variant of his trademark quote ("Now, I will truly walk down the path of heaven and rule over all.").
Episode 27 (Kamen Rider Ultimate Forms):  Kamen Rider Stronger's upgrade is not mentioned (as it is not an "Ultimate Form", but rather a temporary power upgrade) and the short starts with Yamato commenting on Black RX and his modes RX Robo Rider and RX Bio Rider. It then moves on to Kamen Rider Kuuga Ultimate Form, Kamen Rider Agito Shining Form, Kamen Rider Ryuki Survive, Kamen Rider Faiz Blaster Form, Kamen Rider Blade King Form, and Kamen Rider Armed Hibiki. Suddenly, Yamato and Tendo are about to duel with the others looking on and shown on screen is Kabuto's Ultimate Form, Hyper Form.

Parodies
Episode 327-B of Sgt. Frog titled  features the members of the Keroro Platoon trying to invade Earth in Clock Up mode.

International broadcasts
Kabuto was broadcast in South Korea as Masked Rider Kabuto ( Gamyeon Raideo Gabuto) in 2008. In the Philippines, the show was broadcast on Cartoon Network and dubbed in English. In Singapore, this show is also dubbed and debuted on June 20, 2009, on Okto. In Malaysia, this show was dubbed in Malay on NTV7.

References

External links

Kabuto
2006 Japanese television series debuts
2007 Japanese television series endings
Television series about insects
Japan in fiction
Television shows set in Japan
Abandoned buildings and structures in fiction
Alien invasions in television
Alternate history television series
Television series set in 2006
Sentient objects in fiction
Experimental medical treatments in fiction
Fiction about meteoroids
Fiction about parasites
Television series about viral outbreaks